Manjur Rahman Biswas (born 15 April 1950) is a Bangladesh Jatiya Party politician. He was elected a member of parliament for Pabna-4 in 1988.

Early life and career
Biswas was born 15 April 1950 in Pabna District. He was elected a member of parliament in 1988 from Pabna-4.

References 

Living people
1950 births
People from Pabna District
Jatiya Party politicians
4th Jatiya Sangsad members